Eltanin may refer to:

 Eltanin Fault System, a fault zone across the Pacific-Antarctic Ridge 
 Eltanin Impact, an asteroid impact in the Pacific Ocean
 Gamma Draconis, a star in the constellation Draco.
 USNS Eltanin (T-AK-270), a United States navy ship.

See also
 Eltanin Bay, a bay in Antarctica
 Eltanin Antenna, a usual object photographed on the sea floor by the USNS Eltanin